The Mabel Shaw Bridges Music Auditorium, more commonly known as Bridges Auditorium or Big Bridges (to distinguish it from nearby Bridges Hall of Music, known as Little Bridges), is a 2500-seat auditorium at Pomona College in Claremont, California, United States. It was designed by William Templeton Johnson and opened in 1932. It hosts a variety of performances for the college and outside groups.

History

The auditorium was built as a joint project of the Claremont Colleges consortium. It was sponsored by the parents of Mabel Shaw Bridges, a student in Pomona's class of 1908 who died of illness in her junior year, and H.H. Timken, president of the Timken Roller Bearing Company.

From its completion until the opening of the Dorothy Chandler Pavilion in 1964, it was arguably the premier destination of choice for prominent visitors to Southern California. It was also the largest collegiate auditorium on the West Coast, with a capacity nearly twice that of Pomona and equal to that of the city of Claremont. The Los Angeles Philharmonic frequently performed there.

The auditorium was renovated from 1975 to 1977 for seismic retrofitting and cosmetic repairs. In 2007, control was transferred from the consortium to Pomona individually.

Pomona's 2015 master plan classifies Big Bridges as a "building notable for establishing the distinctive context" of the college, and describes it as a symbol of the college's regional civic engagement. A 2015 environmental impact report from the college identifies it as eligible for listing on the National Register of Historic Places, although  the college has not yet applied for it to be listed. John Neiuber, writing for the Claremont Courier in 2017, expressed surprise it is not listed.

Architecture

Big Bridges is the primary visual anchor point for the east side of Marston Quadrangle, the center of Pomona's campus. It was constructed in a Renaissance Revival style modeled after northern Italy, and incorporates Art Deco elements. It has large porticos on its front and sides with arched columns, and a large formally adorned foyer inside the main entrance. The building's frieze features the names of five eminent composers; it was the target of a famous 1975 prank in which the one for Frédéric Chopin was replaced with one honoring Frank Zappa.

The auditorium has a capacity of 2,494 people, including a 500-seat cantilevered balcony. There are no supporting columns, allowing all seats to have unobstructed views of the  proscenium.

The basement has a historical exhibit.

Ceiling

A mural by Italian-American artist John B. Smeraldi covers the  parabolic domed ceiling of the auditorium. It depicts a variety of constellations in silver and gold leaf against a pale blue background.

Usage

Big Bridges hosts a variety of events and performances for the college, including orientation sessions, concerts, and guest speaker lectures. The college also rents the auditorium to outside groups. A number of films and television shows have used the auditorium as a set.

References

External links

 

Pomona College
Renaissance Revival architecture in California
Art Deco architecture in California
Music venues in California
School buildings completed in 1931
Claremont, California
Music venues completed in 1931
Auditoriums in the United States